Proletar ('The Proletarian') was a 4-page Armenian language communist weekly newspaper published in New York City, United States, founded in 1924. The newspaper was published by the Proletarian Publishing Co. The newspaper claimed a circulation of 1,100 copies in 1924.

References

Armenian-American history
Armenian-language newspapers
Armenian-American culture in New York City
Newspapers established in 1924
Communist newspapers
Defunct newspapers published in New York City